Minuscule 599 (in the Gregory-Aland numbering), A599 (von Soden), is a Greek minuscule manuscript of the New Testament, on paper. Palaeographically it has been assigned to the 15th century. The manuscript has complex contents. It was labelled by Scrivener as 467.
It has marginalia.

Description 

The codex contains the text of the four Gospels on 441 paper leaves (size ). The text is written in one column per page, 42 lines per page.

It has a commentary, to the Mark of Victorinus of Pettau.

The order of Gospels: John, Matthew, Mark, and Luke (as in codex 538 and Coptic manuscripts).

Text 

The Greek text of the codex Aland did not place in any Category. It was not examined by using Claremont Profile Method.

History 

The manuscript was added to the list of New Testament manuscripts by Scrivener. The manuscript was described by Zanetti in 1740. It was examined by Dean Burgon. Gregory saw it in 1886.

The manuscript currently is housed at the Biblioteca Marciana (Gr. Z. 495 (1048)), at Venice.

See also 

 List of New Testament minuscules
 Biblical manuscript
 Textual criticism

References

Further reading 

 A. M. Zanetti & A. Bongiovanni, Graeca D. Marci Bibliotheca codicum manuscriptorum (Venice 1740), p. 259.

Greek New Testament minuscules
15th-century biblical manuscripts